Environmental Earth Sciences is an international multidisciplinary scientific journal published 24 times a year by Springer. Its self-stated focus is on "all aspects of interaction between humans, natural resources, ecosystems, special climates or unique geographic zones, and the earth". Its subject areas include water and soil contamination caused by waste management; environmental problems associated with transportation by land, air, and water; and geological processes that may impact biosystems or humans.

Editorial board 

The editors-in-chief of Environmental Earth Sciences are Gunter Dörhöfer, James LaMoreaux and Olaf Kolditz.

Abstracting and indexing 

The journal is indexed by the following services, among others: the Science Citation Index; Journal Citation Reports (the JCR); Scopus; Chemical Abstracts Service (CAS); AGRICOLA; Aquatic Sciences and Fisheries Abstracts (ASFA); Biological Abstracts; BIOSIS Previews; CAB Abstracts; Current Contents Agricultural, Biological, and Environmental Sciences; Ei Compendex; Elsevier Biobase; GEOBASE; GeoRef; the INIS Atomindex; and several EBSCO databases.

References

External links 

 

English-language journals
Geology journals
Springer Science+Business Media academic journals
Publications established in 2009
Waste management journals
Academic journals published in Germany